Hatchville is an unincorporated community located in the towns of Lucas and Weston in Dunn County, Wisconsin, Spring Lake in Pierce County, Wisconsin, and Cady in St. Croix County, Wisconsin, United States. The community was named for two brothers, Frank and Ed Hatch, who owned and operated a combined store and community center. Frank Hatch opened the post office in November 1889.

Notes

Unincorporated communities in Dunn County, Wisconsin
Unincorporated communities in Pierce County, Wisconsin
Unincorporated communities in St. Croix County, Wisconsin
Unincorporated communities in Wisconsin